Marady is a village in Ernakulam district in the Indian state of Kerala.

Marady Grama Panchayath office is located in South Marady. Areas near to MC Road is Known as East Marady. Areas which is near to Muvattupuzha town is known as North Marady. All remaining areas are known as South Marady which is covered by Muvattupuzha piravam Road.

Major Hindu Religious attractions are  Marady Bhagavathy temple ( Marady Kavu), Aruvikkal Devi Temple, Trikka Mahadeva temple and Sree krishna temple.

Major Christian Churches are St. Mary's Jacobite Syrian Church in Kurukkunnapuram, St. George Jacobite Syrian Church in Erattayanikkunnu, Mor Gregorios Jacobite Syrian Church in North Marady, Mount Horeb St. Thomas Jacobite Syrian Church in South Marady and St. George Catholic Church in East Marady.

Marady Grama Panchayath comes under Muvattupuzha assembly constituency, which in turn is a part of Idukki (Lok Sabha constituency).

The Marady Grama Panchayath consists of thirteen wards and the present panchayath president is Sheri O.P. Baby udf .

Main places in Marady 
East Marady 
South Marady 
North Marady
Kayanadu

Demographics
 India census, Marady had a population of 16499 with 8305 males and 8194 females.

Educational organizations 
 Govt. Vocational Higher Secondary School East Marady
 Govt.L.P.School Kurukkunnapuram 
 Govt.U.P.School Erattayanikunnu
 Govt.U.P.School North Marady
 Holy Family English Medium School East Marady

Nearby towns 
Muvattupuzha
Koothattukulam
Kolenchery
Piravom

References

External links 
 

Villages in Ernakulam district